Samuel Gaumain O.F.M. Cap. (4 January 1915 – 20 August 2010) was a French prelate of the Roman Catholic Church.

Gaumain was born in Saint-Pierre-de-l'Isle, France in January 1915. He was ordained a priest on 12 March 1938 in the Catholic religious order, the Order of Friars Minor Capuchin. He was appointed bishop of Moundou Diocese (Chad) on 19 December 1959 and ordained a bishop on 28 April 1960. He remained in this position until he resigned on 19 December 1974.

External links
Catholic-Hierarchy

1915 births
2010 deaths
French Roman Catholic bishops in Africa
20th-century French Roman Catholic bishops
20th-century Roman Catholic bishops in Chad
Participants in the Second Vatican Council
Capuchin bishops
Roman Catholic bishops of Moundou